Code page 770 (also known as CP 770) is a code page used under DOS to write the Estonian, Lithuanian and Latvian languages.

Character set
The following table shows code page 770. Each character is shown with its equivalent Unicode code point. Only the second half of the table (code points 128–255) is shown, the first half (code points 0–127) being the same as code page 437.

References

770